Rodney Wallace Doeseb (born 10 September 1977) is a retired Namibian football defender.

References

1977 births
Living people
Namibian men's footballers
Namibia international footballers
Chief Santos players
Eleven Arrows F.C. players
Association football defenders